Tight Knit is a full-length album by Vetiver. It was released on February 17, 2009, under Sub Pop Records.

Track listing
All songs written by Andy Cabic.
 "Rolling Sea" – 5:19
 "Sister" – 3:44
 "Everyday" – 3:49
 "Through the Front Door" – 4:27
 "Down from Above" – 3:54
 "On the Other Side" – 3:10
 "More of This" – 4:01
 "Another Reason to Go" – 3:44
 "Strictly Rule" – 4:29
 "At Forest Edge" – 5:48
 "Pay No Mind (Bonus Track)"

References

2009 albums
Vetiver albums
Sub Pop albums